Monema meyi is a moth of the family Limacodidae. It is found in China (Hubei, Hunan, Fujian, Jiangxi, Guangdong, Hainan, Guangxi, Sichuan, Guizhou, Yunnan) and Vietnam.

The wingspan is 35–38 mm for males and 36–42 mm for females.

References

Moths described in 2009
Limacodidae
Moths of Asia